He Weifang (born July 17, 1960) is a former professor at Peking University of China and an activist striving to reform the Chinese judicial system, who has argued that the Chinese Communist Party is an unregistered and therefore an illegal organization in China.

He earned a B.A. at Southwest University of Political Science & Law, and an LL.M at Peking College of Political Science and Law (former China University of Political Science and Law).

He was an associate professor in China University of Political Science and Law from 1985 to 1995, then become a professor and Ph.D. adviser at Peking University.

Since 1992, he has striven to reform the Chinese judicial system.  He has written many papers on the importance of modernizing China's judicial system, earning him the nickname "Justice He".  His works includes The Judicial Ideals and Institutions and The Ways to Carry Justice.

Because of his public support and signing for Liu Xiaobo's Charter 08, He Weifang's position at Peking University became untenable and he was forced to resign. In 2008, he accepted a job offer to be the dean of the law school of Zhejiang University. However, the Chinese Communist Party forced the school to withdraw the job offer, and He was instead given a position in the remote city of Shihezi in Xinjiang. Richard McGregor, author of The Party: The Secret World of China's Communist Rulers, said that this was "a deliberately humiliating transfer, akin to a Harvard Law School professor being reassigned to a small community college in rural Texas."

On October 6, 2010, He Weifang gave a speech at Stockholm University, concerning reform of Chinese Court Organization Law and freedom of speech.

References
 McGregor, Richard. The Party: The Secret World of China's Communist Rulers. Harper Perennial: New York, 2012. . Originally published in 2010 by Allen Lane, a Penguin Books imprint.

Notes

External links

Judicial independence should come first China Daily/Beijing Review, November 15, 2005
Leading Chinese dissident claims freedom of speech worse than before Olympics
He Weifang's blog
a series of articles by He Weifang in Chinese, English and French

Chinese activists
Chinese legal scholars
Academic staff of Peking University
Academic staff of Zhejiang University
Charter 08 signatories
Living people
People from Yantai
Chinese anti-communists
Educators from Shandong
Academic staff of China University of Political Science and Law
1960 births